Gerd Audehm (born 14 August 1968 in Schipkau, Bezirk Cottbus) is a German former professional cyclist.

In 2000 Audehm, was in a coma for a month, because he had a lack of oxygen in his brain caused by an accident in the gym.

He rode in 2 editions of the Tour de France, in 1993 and 1994. He finished in 99th place in 1993 and 28th place in 1994.

Major results
1988
 1st Stage 1 Tour of Austria
1989
 1st Stage 8 Tour of Greece
1991
 1st Overall Rheinland-Pfalz-Rundfahrt
 9th Overall Peace Race
1992
 1st Overall Rheinland-Pfalz-Rundfahrt
1995
 3rd Clásica de Sabiñánigo
1996
 6th Overall Tour du Limousin
1997
 9th Overall Tour of Austria

Grand Tour general classification results timeline

References

1968 births
Living people
People from Oberspreewald-Lausitz
People from Bezirk Cottbus
German male cyclists
Cyclists from Brandenburg
East German male cyclists